Chityala is a village and a mandal in Jayashankar Bhupalpally district in the state of Telangana in India.

Map
https://www.google.co.in/maps/place/Chityal,+Telangana/@18.3296269,79.66992,14z/data=!4m2!3m1!1s0x3a333cb5f29d9775:0xdb3300e5d741c473?hl=en

See also
Dwarakapet
Pangidipalle

References 

Mandals in Jayashankar Bhupalpally district
Villages in Jayashankar Bhupalpally district